Shibaji Chatterjee (sometimes also credited as Shivaji Chattopadhyaya) is an Indian singer and composer. He was born in Kolkata.

Personal life 
He is married to Arundhati Holme Chowdhury  since 1987.

Discography

Singer
 Chander Bari (2007)
 Alo (2003)
 Jiban Sandhan (1997)
 1942: A Love Story (1994)
 Prithibir Shesh Station (1993)
 Pennam Calcutta (1992)
 Path-o-Prasad (1991)
 Sajani Go Sajani (1991)
 Neelimay Neel (1991)
 Mahapith Tarapith (1989)
 Agaman (1988)
 Anjali (1989)
 Abir (1987)
 Bhalobasa Bhalobasa (1985)
 Samapti (1983)

Composer
 Chander Bari (2007)
 Bhalobasar Anek Naam (2006)
 Alo (2003)

Awards

References

External links
 
 Shibaji Chatterjee in Gomolo

Living people
Bengali musicians
Indian film score composers
People from West Bengal
Bengali Hindus
Indian Hindus
Year of birth missing (living people)
Singers from West Bengal